Cine quinqui or cine kinki (meaning "delinquency cinema") is a Spanish exploitation film genre that was most popular at the end of the 1970s and in the 1980s.

Features 
The films were centered around underclass delinquents, drugs, and love, and usually starred non-professional actors picked off the street.

Quinqui films focused on marginalized working-class adolescents in the outskirts of Spanish cities involved in small-scale robbery and street crime. They showed raw violence, explicit sex, police brutality, and commonly depicted heroin use.

The genre draws inspiration from Italian neorealism and the French New Wave. Several of the stars of quinqui cinema would go on to die prematurely, most due to heroin use but some of AIDS.

Notable films

Legacy 
Historias del Kronen (1995)  (1999), 7 Virgins (2005),  (2006),  (2012),  (2016) or Outlaws.

References 

Cinema of Spain
Film genres
